Lo que escondían sus ojos is a Spanish romance television miniseries directed by Salvador Calvo adapting the novel of the same name by Nieves Herrero, which focuses on the adulterous love story between Sonsoles Icaza and Ramón Serrano Suñer. It stars Blanca Suárez and Rubén Cortada. While successful in terms of audience, the miniseries, with limited historical rigor, was decried as a banalization of the Francoist regime and the figure of Serrano Suñer in particular. It aired in 2016 on Telecinco.

Premise 
Set in between Madrid and San Sebastián, the plot concerns the adulterous love story between Ramón Serrano Suñer (Rubén Cortada) —Minister of Foreign Affairs of the Francoist regime, married to Zita Polo (Loreto Mauleón), and co-brother-in law of Francisco Franco (Javier Gutiérrez)— and Sonsoles de Icaza (Blanca Suárez) —the Marquise of Llanzol, married to the older Francisco de Paula Díez de Rivera (Emilio Gutiérrez Caba)—, after they meet in 1942 in a gala at the Hotel Ritz.

Cast 
Main
 Rubén Cortada as Ramón Serrano Suñer, Francisco Franco's co-brother-in-law and Minister of Foreign Affairs.
 Emilio Gutiérrez Caba as Francisco de Paula Díez de Rivera, Marquis of Llanzol, Sonsoles' husband.
 Javier Gutiérrez as Francisco Franco.
  as Carmen Polo, Francisco Franco's wife.
 Loreto Mauleón as Zita Polo, Serrano Suñer's wife and Carmen Polo's sister.
 Javier Rey as Cristóbal Balenciaga.
 Antonio Pagudo as Dionisio Ridruejo.
 Víctor Clavijo as Antonio Tovar.
 Verónika Moral as Carmen de Icaza, Sonsoles de Icaza's sister.
 David Solans as Ramón Serrano Polo.
  as Beatriz de León y Loynaz, Sonsoles de Icaza's mother.
 Pepa Rus as Matilde, Sonsoles de Icaza's lady-in-waiting.
 Carlos Santos as Emilio, Matilde's best friend.
  as Juan, the butler at Llanzol's mansion.
 Aïda Ballmann as Hilde, a governess.
 Carolina Meijer as Olivia, a governess.
  as Pura Huétor, sister-in-law of the Marquises of Lanzol.
 Ben Temple as Samuel Hoare, British Ambassador in Spain.

Production 

Lo que escondían sus ojos was based on the novel of the same name by Nieves Herrero. Produced by MOD Producciones (a subsidiary of Mediaset España) and scripted by Helena Medina, the miniseries was directed by Salvador Calvo. Felipe Alba was charged with the cinematography direction whereas Marcelo Pacheco worked in the art direction.

With key settings in the fiction consisting of Madrid and San Sebastián, production worked both in the Spanish capital and San Sebastián as well as in El Espinar (province of Segovia). Shooting locations in San Sebastián included the Beach of La Concha and the Palace of Miramar.

Release and reception 
The 4-part miniseries premiered on 22 November 2016, earning a 19.3% audience share. The broadcasting run ended on 20 December 2016. It commanded "great" viewership ratings, averaging 3.2 million viewers and a 18.9% share.

Lo que escondían sus ojos was decried as a banalization of the Francoist dictatorship and the figure of Serrano Suñer in particular, then Minister of Foreign Affairs, Franco's right-hand (he was known at the height of his power as Ministro Presidente, "Minister-President") and a prominent Philo-Nazi figure within the regime: his actions include the elaboration of the legislation enabling the seizure of information that allowed for the imprisonment and killing of thousands of former members of parties, trade unions and Republican associations and a deal reached with Heinrich Himmler on Gestapo–Spanish police collaboration to repatriate Republican exiles, none of which is palpably dealt with in the fiction.

Mediaset (Italy) purchased the rights for the broadcasting in Italy. The miniseries aired for the first time on Canale 5 under the title Quello che nascondono i tuoi occhi from 3 January 2017 to 15 January 2017.

Awards and nominations 

|-
| align = "center" rowspan = "3" | 2017 || 64th Ondas Awards || Best Actress || Blanca Suárez ||  || 
|-
| 19th Iris Awards || Best Actress || Blanca Suárez ||  || 
|-
| 5th  || colspan = "2" | Best Miniseries or TV Movie ||  || 
|}

References 
Notes

Citations

Bibliography
 

Spanish television miniseries
Television series based on Spanish novels
Television series set in 1942
2010s romantic drama television series
2010s Spanish drama television series
2016 Spanish television series debuts
2016 Spanish television series endings
Cultural depictions of Francisco Franco
Television shows set in Madrid
Television shows filmed in Spain
Spanish-language television shows
Telecinco network series
Adultery in television
Television shows set in the Basque Country (autonomous community)
Television series by MOD Producciones